Stojan Petruševski (born 10 December 1964 in Skopje, Macedonia) is a retired Macedonian handball player who played mainly for Vardar Vatrostalna. Its last team was RK Vardar Vatrosalna in 2003. In 2002 he became an assistant coach in RK Vardar from Skopje, Macedonia. In 2005 he became coach in Macedonian Junior handball team. He also has played for Macedonian handball team.

External links 
 EHF Profile

1964 births
Living people